Per Olsen (13 June 1932 – 9 November 2013) was a Norwegian cross-country skier.

He participated at the 1956 Winter Olympics in Cortina d'Ampezzo, where he placed fourth in the 4 × 10 km relay together with Håkon Brusveen, Martin Stokken and Hallgeir Brenden.

He was born in Alta, and represented Alta IF. He is the father-in-law of Anette Tønsberg.

Cross-country skiing results

Olympic Games

World Championships

References

1932 births
2013 deaths
People from Alta, Norway
Cross-country skiers at the 1956 Winter Olympics
Norwegian male cross-country skiers
Olympic cross-country skiers of Norway
Sportspeople from Troms og Finnmark